Karimula Magomedovich Barkalaev (born January 23, 1973) is a Russian former professional mixed martial artist (MMA), Judoka and Sanda fighter. He is the first and only Russian national to have won the ADCC Submission Fighting World Championship. According to Sport Express, on American forums, he was called most mysterious fighter in the history of MMA. On the MMA ranking system portal Fight Matrix, Barkalaev reached a peak ranking of No. 3 Light Heavyweight in 1999.

Background 

Barkalaev was born on January 23, 1973, in the village of Tivi, Qvareli, Georgian SSR. He is of Avar descent.

After sixth grade, he moved to Kaspiysk, Dagestan where he attended a sports boarding school for Judo and graduated in 1990. He trained with his cousin, Dzhabrail Barkalaev who later became a silver medalist at the 1996 Russian Judo Championship.

In 1993, Barkalaev started training in Sanda. He was winner of the 1995 and 1996 Russian Wushu Championships. He was also a silver medalist in the 1996 European Wushu Championship in Rome.

In 1997, Barkalaev met Volk Han and would train under him to participate in mixed martial arts.

Mixed martial arts career 
Barkalaev spent his early career fighting under the International Absolute Fighting Council (IAFC) promotion in Russia.

On May 23, 1998, he fought against Gilbert Yvel. Yvel was disqualified after Barkalaev's coach Volk Han noted the referee Yvel had illegally bitten his fighter

On February 8, 2001, Barkalaev competed in the Shidokan Jitsu – Warriors 1 Tournament in Kuwait. He faced Dave Menne in the finals and lost by unanimous decision after referee, John McCarthy deducted a point for grabbing the cage. After the fight, he complained how the event was unfair since the referee, as well as all three judges were from the U.S.

Since that tournament, Barkalaev has not participated in any MMA bouts. He has stated there was a lack of financial incentive and interest in continuing.

Professional grappling career

In 1998, Barkalaev competed in the inaugural tournament of the ADCC World Championship. He defeated Carlos Lopez, Toby Imada and Igor Yakimov to reach the finals of the −88 kg division. In the finals he lost to Rodrigo Gracie on points after a 30-minute bout.

In 1999, Barkalaev returned to compete in the 1999 ADCC World Championship. He defeated Renato Verissimo, Amaury Bitetti and Egan Inoue all by points. In the finals he faced Belarusian wrestler, Aleksandr Savko where he won on points and became champion of the −88 kg division.

In 2000, Barkalaev moved up in weight class to compete in the −99 kg division of the 2000 ADCC World Championship. He defeated Nino Schembri and faced Ricardo Arona in the semi-finals. The match between the two eventually became a brawl and Arona won due to points. At the time, Barkalaev was an instructor in Abu Dhabi and a representative of the local Sheikh. His action offended the Sheikh who asked for Barkalaev's arrest. After the match, Barkalaev was escorted off the mat and spent a week in prison. He was eventually released by the Sheikh and has stated he wanted to have a rematch with Arona under MMA rules. Barkalaev has not participated in any ADCC World Championships since.

Personal life

Barkalaev currently works as a director for Dagpotrebsoyuz which is the Consumers' Union of Dagestan.

He currently teaches his skills to young people and can be found at the Ali Aliyev Sport Complex which he was previously in charge of for five years.

Barkalaev graduated from business school in 2003. He was nominated by the Russian All-People's Union to stand in for the People's Assembly of the Republic of Dagestan although he dropped out after registration.

Mixed martial arts record 

|-
| Loss
| align=center| 11–1
| Dave Menne
| Decision (unanimous)
| rowspan=3|Shidokan Jitsu: Warrior's War
| rowspan=3|
| align=center| 1
| align=center| 10:00
| rowspan=3|Kuwait City, Kuwait
|-
| Win
| align=center| 11–0
| Jose Landi-Jons
| TKO (punches)
| align=center| 1
| align=center| 5:59
| 
|-
| Win
| align=center| 10–0
| Dersu Lerma
| Decision (unanimous)
| align=center| 1
| align=center| 10:00
| 
|-
| Win
| align=center| 9–0
| Martin Malkhasyan
| TKO (strikes)
| rowspan=3|IAFC: Brilliant Cup 1999
| rowspan=3|
| align=center| 1
| align=center| N/A
| rowspan=3|Kyiv, Ukraine
| 
|-
| Win
| align=center| 8–0
| Roman Savochka
| KO
| align=center| 1
| align=center| N/A
| 
|-
| Win
| align=center| 7–0
| Oleg Chemodurov
| TKO (strikes)
| align=center| 1
| align=center| N/A
| 
|-
| Win
| align=center| 6–0
| Sergei Akinin
| TKO (submission to Punches)
| IAFC: Russian Championship 1999 (Day 2)
| 
| align=center| 1
| align=center| 1:04
| Moscow, Russia
| 
|-
| Win
| align=center| 5–0
| Gilbert Yvel
| DQ (biting)
| IAFC: European Championship 1998
| 
| align=center| 1
| align=center| 4:49
| Moscow, Russia
| 
|-
| Win
| align=center| 4–0
| Valery Pliev
| N/A
| rowspan=3|IAFC: Russian Championship 1997
| rowspan=3|
| align=center| 1
| align=center| N/A
| rowspan=3|Moscow, Russia
|
|-
| Win
| align=center| 3–0
| Valery Nikulin
| N/A
| align=center| 1
| align=center| N/A
| 
|-
| Win
| align=center| 2–0
| Igor Gerus
| N/A
| align=center| 1
| align=center| N/A
| 
|-
| Win
| align=center| 1–0
| Joe Charles
| Submission (forearm choke)
| IAFC: Absolute Fighting Championship 2: Day 1
| 
| align=center| 1
| align=center| 9:19
| Moscow, Russia
|

Submission grappling record

External links

See also 
List of male mixed martial artists

References 

Living people
1973 births
ADCC Submission Fighting World Champions (men)
Avar people
Dagestani mixed martial artists
Light heavyweight mixed martial artists
Heavyweight mixed martial artists
Mixed martial artists utilizing judo
Mixed martial artists utilizing sanshou
Russian male mixed martial artists
Russian people of Dagestani descent
Russian sanshou practitioners